Khatibi  or Khatib is a surname. Notable people with the surname include: :

 Abdelkebir Khatibi (1938–2009), Moroccan literary critic, novelist and playwright
 Amin Khatibi (born 1997), Iranian footballer 
Ghassan El Khatib Labense diplomat  
 Hossein Khatibi (born 1975), former Iranian footballer
 Rasoul Khatibi (born 1978), Iranian football retired player and coach
Reza Khatibi (born 1969), Iranian filmmaker
Sanam Khatibi (born 1979), Belgian artist

See also
 Khatibi, village in South Khorasan Province, Iran
 Khatib (disambiguation)
 Katib

References 

Arabic-language surnames
Persian-language surnames